The 1978 PBA season was the fourth season of the Philippine Basketball Association (PBA).

Executive board
 Leopoldo L. Prieto (Commissioner) 
 Domingo Y. Itchon (President, representing Elizalde & Co., Inc.)
 Dante Silverio (Vice President, representing Delta Motor Corporation)
 Walter Euyang (Treasurer, representing Universal Textile Mills, Inc.)

Season highlights
In a special pre-season event, a Crispa-PBA All-Star series was played, a five-game duel decided by cumulative scores which raked in more funds to the PBA players' trust fund. Crispa won three games but lost by 12 points in the cumulative scoring. On February 26, Crispa beat the PBA-All Stars, 99–90, for a 3–2 victory in a series played in Davao, Iloilo, Cebu and Manila. The All-Stars lineup were Robert Jaworski, Francis Arnaiz, Danny Florencio, Manny Paner, Ramon Fernandez, Rudolf Kutch, Abe King, Estoy Estrada, Jun Papa, Lim Eng Beng, Freddie Webb and Johnny Revilla. Their coach was Dante Silverio. 
Toyota Tamaraws wins the All-Filipino title and their fourth championship, winning in four games over newcomer Filmanbank, which reach the finals in their maiden year.
In late September, the Toyota Tamaraws with imports Bruce "Sky" King and Carlos Terry, defeated the national teams of Yugoslavia and Canada in exhibition match prior to the World Basketball Championship held in Manila, an event Yugoslavia tops and saw Canada placing fifth. 
U/Tex became the first team to break the monopoly of titles by Toyota and Crispa by winning the Open Conference crown via 3–0 sweep over Crispa 400s. The Wranglers were coach by Tommy Manotoc and reinforced by Glenn McDonald and Byron "Snake" Jones. 
Toyota won their second title of the season by winning the Invitational Championship against Tanduay Esquires for their 5th PBA crown.

Opening ceremonies
The muses for the participating teams are as follows:

Champions
 All Filipino Conference: Toyota Tamaraws
 Open Conference: U/Tex Wranglers
 Invitational Championship: Toyota Tamaraws
 Team with best win–loss percentage: Toyota Tamaraws (40–15, .727)
 Best Team of the Year: Toyota Tamaraws (2nd)

Individual awards
 Most Valuable Player: Robert Jaworski (Toyota)
 Rookie of the Year: Jimmy Manansala (Tanduay)
 Mythical Five:
Robert Jaworski (Toyota)
Lim Eng Beng (U/Tex)
Ramon Fernandez (Toyota)
Freddie Hubalde (Crispa)
Philip Cezar (Crispa)

Cumulative standings

References